Irène Stecyk (born 27 July 1937) is a Belgian writer.

The daughter of a Ukrainian father and a Belgian mother, she was born in Liège and was educated there, going on to study library science. She worked as a librarian and was also secretary for the writer Alexis Curvers for a number of years.

In 1960, she published a collection of poetry Les monstres sympathiques. However, she is best known as a novelist. Stecyk has also published stories and articles in various journals in France and Belgium.

She was married to the poet Yves Lebon, who died in 2003.

Awards and honours
 1972 – Prix Victor-Rossel for Une petite femme aux yeux bleus

Selected works 
 Une petite femme aux yeux bleus (1973), received the Prix Victor-Rossel, was later adapted for television
 Mazeppa, prince de l'Ukraine (1981), received the Prix Jeanne Boujassy awarded by the French Société des gens de lettres and the prize awarded every five years for a historical novel by the 
 Perle morte (1992), received the Prix Sander Pierron from the Académie royale de langue et de littérature françaises de Belgique
 La Balzac (1992), received the Prix du Conseil de la Communauté Française
 La fille de Pierre (2001)

References 

1937 births
Living people
20th-century Belgian novelists
Belgian poets in French
Writers from Liège
Belgian people of Ukrainian descent
Belgian women poets
Belgian women novelists
21st-century Belgian novelists
20th-century Belgian poets
20th-century Belgian women writers
21st-century Belgian women writers